Susan Broomhall  is an Australian historian and academic. She is an Australian Research Council Future Fellow and Professor of History at The University of Western Australia, and from 2018 Co-Director of the ARC Centre of Excellence for the History of Emotions (CHE). She was a Foundation Chief Investigator (CI) in the 'Shaping the Modern' Program of the Centre, before commencing her Australian Research Council Future Fellowship within CHE in October 2014, and the Acting Director in 2011. She is a specialist in gender history and the history of emotions.

Education 
Broomhall was born in Perth in 1974. She graduated BA with First-Class Honours in French Studies and History at the University of Western Australia in 1996, and completed her PhD with Distinction at UWA in 1999, on 'Women and Publication in Sixteenth-century France', supervised by Patricia Crawford and Beverley Ormerod. She then completed a Diplome d'Etudes Approfondies, avec Mention Très Bien in 2000 at Centre d'Etudes Supérieures de la Renaissance, associated with Université François Rabelais, in Tours, France.

Career 
Broomhall's projects with the CHE analyse medieval and early modern objects and emotions, particularly as they are presented in modern museum, heritage and tourism environments. Her research explores i) the interpretation of medieval and early modern objects in the history of emotional processes and practices; ii) the affective origins of specific medieval and early modern objects; iii) the emotional interpretation of medieval and early modern objects in museum, gallery and tourism contexts; and iv) affective materiality.

Her Future Fellow research project focuses on emotions and power in the correspondence of Catherine de Medici. She has also published extensively, with Jacqueline van Gent, on the history of the Nassau-Orange dynasty in the early modern Netherlands.

Broomhall was the editor of Parergon: The Journal of the Australian and New Zealand Association for Medieval and Early Modern Studies, from 2017 until 2021. She is also Series Editor of Gender and Power in the Premodern World.

Awards and prizes 
In 2012 Broomhall was elected a Fellow of the Australian Academy of the Humanities.

In 2017 she was awarded, with David Barrie, the Frank Watson Prize for Best Book in Scottish History (2015-2016) for the two-volume Police Courts in Nineteenth-Century Scotland.

Along with several other contributors, Broomhall was awarded the 2017 CHASS Australia Book Prize  for Distinctive Work in the Humanities, Arts and Social Sciences (an annual prize awarded by the Council for the Humanities, Arts and Social Sciences) for her work on the Zest Festival.

In 1997 she was awarded the Bibliographical Society of Australia and New Zealand Essay Prize for the essay "French Women in Print, 1488 to 1599".

In 1999 she won the Society for the Social History of Medicine Student Essay Prize for her article on women's reproductive knowledge in sixteenth-century France.

Bibliography

As author
 
 
 
 
 
 Barrie, David & Broomhall, Susan. Police Courts in Nineteenth-Century Scotland, Volume 1: Magistrates, Media and the Masses  Ashgate, 2014.
 Barrie, David & Broomhall, Susan. Police Courts in Nineteenth-Century Scotland, Volume 2: Boundaries, Behaviours and Bodies  Ashgate, 2014.

As editor

In French 

 Broomhall, S. & Winn, C. H. Le Verger fertile des vertus. Honoré Champion, 2004.
 Broomhall, S. & Winn, C. H. Les femmes et l'histoire familiale. Honoré Champion, 2008.

References

External links 

 Research profile at the Gender and Women's History Research Centre, Australian Catholic University
 Research profile at the University of Western Australia
 Fellow profile at the Australian Academy of the Humanities
 Research articles at The Conversation

1974 births
Living people
Australian women historians
Academic staff of the University of Western Australia
University of Western Australia alumni
Fellows of the Australian Academy of the Humanities
Historians of the Dutch East India Company
Academic staff of the Australian Catholic University